Mustafa Burak Bozan (born 23 August 2000) is a Turkish professional footballer who plays as a goalkeeper for Turkish club Gaziantep.

Career
Bozan is a youth product of Gaziantep, and signed his first professional contract with the club in February 2018. He made his first senior debut with Gaziantep in a 3–0 Turkish Cup win over Turgutluspor on 31 October 2019. He made his professional debut with Gaziantep in a 1–0 Süper Lig win over Hatayspor on 15 May 2021.

International career
Bozan represented the Turkey U18s once in a friendly 2–1 loss to the Russia U18 in 23 February 2018.

References

External links

2000 births
Living people
People from Mardin
Turkish footballers
Turkey youth international footballers
Association football goalkeepers
Gaziantep F.K. footballers
Süper Lig players